In enzymology, a 2-dehydro-3-deoxy-D-gluconate 5-dehydrogenase is an enzyme that catalyzes the chemical reaction

2-dehydro-3-deoxy-D-gluconate + NAD+  (4S)-4,6-dihydroxy-2,5-dioxohexanoate + NADH + H+

Thus, the two substrates of this enzyme are 2-dehydro-3-deoxy-D-gluconate and NAD+, whereas its 3 products are (4S)-4,6-dihydroxy-2,5-dioxohexanoate, NADH, and H+.

This enzyme participates in pentose and glucuronate interconversions.

Nomenclature 

This enzyme belongs to the family of oxidoreductases, specifically those acting on the CH-OH group of donor with NAD+ or NADP+ as acceptor.  The systematic name of this enzyme class is 2-dehydro-3-deoxy-D-gluconate:NAD+ 5-oxidoreductase. Other names in common use include 2-keto-3-deoxygluconate 5-dehydrogenase, 2-keto-3-deoxy-D-gluconate dehydrogenase, 2-keto-3-deoxygluconate (nicotinamide adenine dinucleotide, (phosphate)) dehydrogenase, 2-keto-3-deoxy-D-gluconate (3-deoxy-D-glycero-2,5-hexodiulosonic, and acid) dehydrogenase.

References 

 
 

EC 1.1.1
NADH-dependent enzymes
Enzymes of unknown structure